The 1941 Andaman Islands earthquake struck the Andaman Islands on June 26 with a magnitude of 7.7 to 8.1. Details of this event are poorly known as much of Southeast Asia was in the turmoil of World War II. The quake caused severe damage in the Andaman Islands. The tsunami it triggered was reported along the Andaman and Nicobar Islands, India, and Sri Lanka. There may have been damage and deaths in Bangladesh, Myanmar, and Thailand due to the tsunami.

Effects
The earthquake partially collapsed Cellular Jail and destroyed other masonry buildings at Port Blair. Ground slumping, soil liquefaction and sand volcanoes were reported. Roads, bridges, embankments, seawalls and jetties were seriously damaged. Large fissures occurred in the ground. Large trees were tilted and uprooted. According to eyewitness accounts, these trees fell in a westernly direction. There was an unspecified number of deaths only described as "few". Shaking was felt over a very wide area; felt reports also came from Colombo, Chennai, Kolkata and Mumbai.

Tsunami
It is claimed that 5,000 drowned in India but no reliable attribution for such figure exists. News reports misattributed these deaths with a storm surge, while the Times of India did not mention a tsunami while reporting the event. No news or scientific reports made mention of a large death toll from the tsunami. It was also unlikely that a  tsunami could result in a high death toll. Reports of the tsunami effects along the Andaman Islands also did not mention any fatalities.

Geology
The earthquake occurred in a convergent boundary zone that separates the Indian Plate from the Burma Plate. The Indian Plate subducts obliquely beneath the Burma Plate at a rate of 6.7 cm/year. It was previously assigned a magnitude of 8.1 to 8.7. The International Seismological Centre assigned this event as having a moment magnitude of 8.0. Further research suggest the earthquake did not occur as a result of rupturing the subduction zone; it was a normal-faulting intraslab earthquake located within the Indian Plate beneath the islands.

See also
 List of earthquakes in 1941
 List of earthquakes in India

References

Sources

 Earthquake and tsunami of June 25, 1941 in the Andaman Sea and the Bay of Bengal – George Pararas-Carayannis
 1941 Tsunami in the Bay of Bengal  – Lamont–Doherty Earth Observatory

External links

1941
1941 tsunamis
1941 earthquakes
1941 in India
History of the Andaman and Nicobar Islands
Tsunamis in India
Tsunamis in Thailand
Tsunamis in Myanmar
1941 in Burma
1941 in Thailand
1941 disasters in India